The 1981 Campeonato Ecuatoriano de Fútbol de la Serie A was the 23rd national championship for football teams in Ecuador.

Teams
The number of teams for this season was played by 12 teams. Deportivo Quito and LDU Cuenca promoted as winners of First Stage of Serie B.

First stage

Second stage

Triangular Final

Second-place play-offs

References

External links
 Línea de Tiempo de eventos y partidos de Liga Deportiva Universitaria
 Calendario de partidos históricos de Liga Deportiva Universitaria
 Sistema de Consulta Interactiva y Herramienta de consulta interactiva de partidos de Liga Deportiva Universitaria

1981
Ecu